The castle folk (or civis) formed a class of freemen who were obliged to provide well-specified services to a royal castle and its ispán, or count, in the medieval Kingdom of Hungary. They were peasants living in villages formed in the lands pertaining to the royal castle. They tilled their estates collectively.

References

Sources

Medieval Kingdom of Hungary